Béclard's triangle is an area whose boundaries are the posterior border of the hyoglossus, the posterior belly of the digastric muscle and the greater horn of the hyoid bone.

References

Human anatomy